The Cuban red-tailed hawk (Buteo jamaicensis solitudinus) is a subspecies of red-tailed hawk native to the Bahamas, Florida, and Cuba.

Description
This subspecies is fairly small, intermediate in size between the Florida red-tailed hawk (B. j. umbrinus) and the nominate subspecies, the Jamaican red-tailed hawk (B. j. jamaicensis), found on islands to the north and south.

Taxonomy
Like other island races, the validity of this subspecies has been called into question, but it has its defenders as well. Generally, this subspecies appears as a diminutive version of B. j. umbrinus in plumage characteristics but is considerably isolated from that race.

References 

Cuban red-tailed hawk